Sir Richard Atkins, 6th Baronet (1728–1756), of Clapham, was an English baronet from 1742 until 1756.

Education
He was educated at John Roysse's Free School in Abingdon, (now Abingdon School) c.1737-c.1742.

Title
Following the death of his older brother Sir Henry Atkins, 5th Baronet in 1742 he became the 6th and last Atkins baronet of Clapham, at the age of 14 but did not receive the estates from the trustees until coming of age in 1749. He was awarded an honorary degree in 1749 by the University of Oxford  and was High Sheriff of Buckinghamshire (1750-1751).

It is reputed that he bought the services of the leading courtesan Kitty Fisher and that he accumulated debts. He died, married to Fanny Murray, without children which ended the baronetcy and his Tickford estates were sold to pay off his debts.

He was a Steward of the OA Club in 1748.

See also
 List of Old Abingdonians

References

1728 births
1756 deaths
People from Clapham
People educated at Abingdon School
Baronets in the Baronetage of England